Watkinson School is a private co-educational independent day school in Hartford, Connecticut, United States. Watkinson is situated on Bloomfield Avenue adjacent to the University of Hartford. It serves students from 6th through 12th grade. Watkinson also offers a postgraduate option, called The Academy at Watkinson, which allows students who have just graduated from high school to spend an additional year taking courses at Watkinson as well as the University of Hartford. Watkinson is the oldest independent school located within the city limits of Hartford.

Currently, Watkinson enrolls 240 students who come from 37 towns all around the Greater Hartford and Pioneer Valley area.

Watkinson is a founding member of the Coalition of Essential Schools. It is one of only five schools to be named a Lead School for this coalition.

Campus and early school history
The organization that became the Watkinson School has its origins in a major bequest of businessman and philanthropist David Watkinson (1778-1857), whose will included provisions for establishing a school for troubled boys.  Originally led by noted Hartford educator Henry Barnard, school trustees built Watkinson's bequest to over $200,000 by 1880.  In that year, a farm was purchased on Park Street, and the institution was opened as a school and working farm known as the Watkinson Juvenile Asylum and Farm School.  In 1892, under the leadership of Rev. Francis Goodwin, the school leased land on the Prosser Farm at the corner of Albany Street and Bloomfield Avenue, which had been purchased by Goodwin for the Handicraft School, an organization whose leadership was identical to that of the Watkinson School.  The Watkinson School facilities were built on this land at the northern end, while those of the Handicraft School were located in its south.  The land occupied by the Watkinson School was formally transferred to the school in 1949.  The school formally adopted the name "Watkinson School" in 1923.

The school campus is located at 140, 180, and 190 Bloomfield Avenue in Hartford and West Hartford. Feringa Hall is the oldest academic building on the campus, built in 1894-5 to a Queen Anne design attributed to Francis Goodwin. Residence houses, originally for the headmaster and his assistant, date to the early 20th century. Frances Goodwin Hall is a two-story brick classroom building with attached gymnasium, built in 1924. The campus was listed on the National Register of Historic Places in 1995.

Notable alumni

Rashawn Dally - soccer player with USL Championship team Hartford Athletic
Johann Smith - soccer player with Major League Soccer team Kalmar FF; as of November 25, 2010, he is a free agent

See also
National Register of Historic Places listings in Hartford, Connecticut
National Register of Historic Places listings in West Hartford, Connecticut

References

External links
 

Coalition of Essential Schools
Private high schools in Connecticut
Schools in Hartford, Connecticut
Educational institutions established in 1881
Preparatory schools in Connecticut
Private middle schools in Connecticut
1881 establishments in Connecticut
National Register of Historic Places in Hartford County, Connecticut
National Register of Historic Places in Hartford, Connecticut
Queen Anne architecture in Connecticut
Georgian Revival architecture in Connecticut
School buildings completed in 1881
West Hartford, Connecticut